Bye Bye Baby is a 1988 Italian romantic comedy film directed by Enrico Oldoini. The film starred Brigitte Nielsen and Carol Alt.  It is one of the few films to feature five-pin billiards on-screen in any detail.

Plot summary
A couple from Milan, Sandra and Paolo, engage in a series of extramarital affairs, reconciliations, escapades, and eventual divorce, beginning during a vacation to Mauritius.  Sandra becomes involved with a handsome doctor, Marcello, while Paolo falls for Lisa, a professional billiards player.

Cast
Carol Alt as Sandra
Luca Barbareschi as Paolo
Brigitte Nielsen as Lisa, a professional five-pin billiards player
Jason Connery as Marcello, a medical doctor

Reception
Brigitte Nielsen was nominated for a Golden Raspberry ("Razzie") for Worst Actress at the 10th Golden Raspberry Awards, where she ended up losing to Heather Locklear for The Return of Swamp Thing.

Los Angeles Times panned the film as thematically repetitive, "daringly banal", and a failure as a sex farce because so little of it is actually comedic. Billiards film review site 8 Ball on the Silver Screen also criticized the film for its unbelievable billiards scenes that indicated no training of Nielsen for the role.

See also
 List of Italian films of 1988

References

External links

1988 films
1988 romantic comedy films
Italian romantic comedy films
Films directed by Enrico Oldoini
Cue sports films
1980s English-language films
1980s Italian films